Lene Pedersen (born 28 April 1977) is a Norwegian ski mountaineer.

Pedersen was born in Bodø. She started ski mountaineering in 2006 and competed first in the same year. She lives in Elverum.

Selected results 
 2005:
 1st, Norwegian Championship
 1st, Norwegian Cup
 2007:
 5th, European Championship relay race (together with Ellen Blom and Bodil Ryste)
 7th, European Championship team race (together with Ellen Blom)
 2008:
 4th, World Championship relay race (together with Ellen Blom, Bodil Ryste and Marit Tveite Bystøl)
 7th, World Championship combination ranking
 8th, World Championship team race (together with Marit Tveite Bystøl)

External links 
 Lene Pedersen at Skimountaineering.org

1977 births
Living people
Norwegian female ski mountaineers
Sportspeople from Bodø
People from Elverum